Sugamuxi may refer to:
 Sugamuxi, last iraca of Sugamuxi, Colombia
 Sogamoso, modern name of Suamox, seat of Sugamuxi
 Sugamuxi Province, the province of which Sogamoso is the capital